The Mapale sea catfish (Cathorops mapale),  is a species of sea catfish in the family Ariidae. It is a tropical fish which is known from Colombia to west Venezuela, where it typically inhabits freshwaters, brackish, in coastal lagoons and near-shore marine waters.

References

Ariidae
Fish described in 2005